LRDC is an abbreviation that may indicate the following: 
Learning Research and Development Center-- interdisciplinary center at the University of Pittsburgh is an interdisciplinary 
Law Reform and Development Commission -- government commission in Namibia responsible for law reform